Anlo Afiadenyigba is a town in the Volta Region of Ghana. The town is located on the eastern part of the Keta Lagoon.

History 

The people of Afiadenyigba are descendants of the Anlo Ewe groups who settled in Anloga. The Anlo ancestors migrated from Notsie in central Togo in the mid –seventeenth century (Between the sea and the lagoon). The Anlo ancestors established several small settlements on the southern and northern shores of the Keta Lagoon. Afiadenyigba is on the northern part.

The conflicts between the Anlo and Keta led to war in 1792 and Keta was razed to the ground. The people of Keta migrated east and founded the Somey State with Agbozume as its traditional capital, on some on land granted to them by Klikor. It was at this time that Salu also went to ask land from the Klikor people to settle on.

Etymology

Ewe adage: Afia de nyigba megbea  ameade madi o

To wit: No land rejects a dead body.

Occupation 

Most of the inhabitants are fisher folk who fish in the Keta Lagoon. The women trade in fried fish between Ghana and Togo. Some of the men are kente weavers who sell their work in Agbozume market.

Music 

Afiadenyigba has been noted for learning and performing many music dances. Fishermen who traveled out to Benin, Togo or Nigeria learnt many dances which they brought to the town. They go to other towns to teach such drums as Gahu Dance

A music and dance group found in the area is the Gadzo Group  founded by the late Mortoo Agbovor in 1939, named after war   dance   and   drum   rhythm   performed   by   the   community's forefathers as they migrated into Southeastern Ghana.

Education 

The town has the Anlo Afiadenyigba Secondary School.  The school is a second cycle institution.

Chiefs of Afiadenyigba 
There are seven chiefs in the town. These are as follows.

Local Government Representation 

The town has three assembly members which represent the town at the Keta Municipal Assembly. These are as follows

References 

5 Felix Kuadugah-contributor, Etymology of Anlo Afiadenyigba

Populated places in the Volta Region